The Waterville team was a minor league baseball team based in Waterville, Maine in 1907. Waterville briefly played as members of the Maine State League, before folding during the season.

History
The 1907 Waterville team briefly played as members of the Maine State League, which reformed as an eight–team Class D level league. Waterford began play in the 1907 season alongside fellow members based in Augusta, Maine (Augusta Senators), Bangor, Maine (Bangor Cubs), Biddeford, Maine (Biddeford Orphans), Lewiston, Maine (Lewiston), Manchester, New Hampshire (Manchester), Portland, Maine (Pine Tree Capers) and a second team in Portland (Portland Blue Sox).

Waterville began play as the 1907 Maine State League season commenced on May 24, 1907. However, the Waterville team folded in June, with an 8–14 record, playing under manager George Boardman. The Manchester, Augusta and Lewiston teams folded shortly after Waterville.

In the final 1907 standings, the 1st place Bangor Cubs had a 47–31 record, followed by the Biddeford Orphans (30–27), Portland Blue Sox (39–41) and Pine Tree Capers (27–32) in the 1907 final standings. The Augusta Senators (27–28), Lewiston (24–23), Manchester (1–7) and Waterville (8–14) teams all folded before the completion of the season.

Waterville, Maine has not hosted another minor league team.

The ballparks
The name of the Waterville home ballpark is not referenced. The facilities on the campus of Colby College were in use in the era. The college was founded in 1813.

Year–by–year records

Notable alumni
No alumni of the 1907 Waterville team advanced to the major leagues.

References

External links
 Team Photo

Professional baseball teams in Maine
Defunct baseball teams in Maine
Baseball teams established in 1907
Baseball teams disestablished in 1907
Maine State League teams
Waterville, Maine
Sports in Kennebec County, Maine